Mimi Hines (born July 17, 1933) is a Canadian singer and comedian best known for her appearances on The Ed Sullivan Show, The Tonight Show and her work on Broadway. She succeeded Barbra Streisand in the original production of Funny Girl.

Life and career

Hines was born in Vancouver, British Columbia, Canada, and resides in the United States. She worked for a time in Anchorage, Alaska, where she met comedian Phil Ford in 1952 while they were working at different night clubs. They married in 1954. On August 28, 1958, she and Ford appeared on The Tonight Show for the first time. Hines sang "Till There Was You". In a later stand-up routine on The Tonight Show, she portrayed the NBC peacock.

In 1964 Hines and Ford filmed a pilot episode for a potential sitcom, Mimi, that would have starred the two as owners of a resort hotel, but the series was not picked up for airing.

In 1966, Hines succeeded Barbra Streisand on Broadway in Funny Girl, performing the role for eighteen months, after which she starred in touring companies of I Do! I Do! and The Prisoner of Second Avenue, as well as productions of Anything Goes, Never Too Late, The Pajama Game, The Unsinkable Molly Brown, No, No, Nanette and Sugar.

She played at Feinstein's at the Regency in New York City. She appeared with the Los Angeles Pops Orchestra and starred in national tours of Sugar Babies and Nite Club Confidential and on a recorded salute to Johnny Mercer called Mostly Mercer.

She toured the world for a year in the title role of Hello, Dolly! and starred in productions of A Majority of One and Can-Can in Florida and in revues featuring the songs of Alan and Marilyn Bergman, How Do You Keep the Music Playing? in Los Angeles, as well as the songs of Rodgers and Hart titled This Funny World at the Kennedy Center in Washington, D.C., and the songs of Jerry Herman at the Schoenberg Theatre in Los Angeles, California.

Hines appeared as Mrs. Latimer on the television program Frasier and returned to Broadway in 1994 for the Tommy Tune production of Grease, in which she appeared as Miss Lynch.

She also co-starred in the off-Broadway revival of Kander and Ebb's 70, Girls, 70, with Jane Powell, Charlotte Rae and Helen Gallagher, and was a guest in the final week of The Rosie O'Donnell Show. She performed for L.A.'s reprise, as Letitia Primrose in On The Twentieth Century, and in 2005 as Berthe in Pippin.

She co-starred in 2002 as Sister Mary Amnesia in the National Tour of the 20th Anniversary production of Nunsense, along with Kaye Ballard, Georgia Engel, Lee Meriwether and Darlene Love. In 2007, Hines starred in the City Center Encores! production of Follies.

References

External links
 
 
 

1933 births
American women singers
American musical theatre actresses
Canadian emigrants to the United States
Canadian women singers
Canadian musical theatre actresses
Living people
Musicians from Vancouver
Actresses from Vancouver
21st-century American women